Greg Humphreys is an American singer, guitarist and songwriter based in New York City who performs solo and as bandleader of Dillon Fence, Hobex and The Greg Humphreys Electric Trio.

Early life
Greg was born and raised in Winston-Salem, North Carolina. His mother was an art teacher and his attorney father was a folk musician, spurring Greg's own artistic creativity from a very early age. In high school, Greg and his classmate, Chris Goode, formed a band called "Trash" that eventually evolved into Dillon Fence.

Career
Dillon Fence, for which Greg was the principal songwriter, vocalist and guitarist, began while Greg was enrolled at the University of North Carolina in the late 1980s. The band released three full-length albums and several EPs on its own and via Mammoth Records and developed a cult following throughout North Carolina. Shortly after the departure of original band members Chris Goode (bass) and Kent Alphin in 1995, Dillon Fence called it quits, although the members still reunite fairly regularly for North Carolina-area shows.

Together with Dillon Fence's last bassist, Andy Ware, Greg began playing as Hobex in 1996, eschewing the indie rock roots of Dillon Fence in favor of the soul and funk music with which Greg had grown up. The band's following in the southeast U.S. led to the band being signed to London Records. The lack of major commercial breakthrough and the strain of constant touring caused Greg to disband Hobex in 2007. Like Dillon Fence, however, Hobex still performs reunion gigs from time to time.

Happy to shed the complications and extra weight of touring with a full band, Greg then began touring as a solo artist with just an acoustic guitar, writing and playing laid-back songs incorporating folk, pop, bluegrass and jazz influences. These songs were documented in a series of self-released CDs: Trunk Songs (2008); Realign Your Mind (2010); People You May Know (2011); Bohemia (2013); and Cosmic Irony (2014).

In 2012, Greg relocated from North Carolina to New York City to be with a woman he had met and fallen in love with at a mutual friend’s funeral. Upon arriving in New York City, Greg met back up with a fellow expatriate from the North Carolina music scene, Matt Brandau (bassist for The Old Ceremony), with whom he collaborated on new recordings. Matt suggested they team up with drummer Keith Robinson (Marcia Ball, Charlie Robison). The group solidified as Greg Humphreys Electric Trio, adding a rock ‘n’ roll element to Greg's solo songs and spawning a whole new batch of compositions tailored to the band members’ expertise in diverse musical styles such as funk, soul, blues and country. In 2014, the GHET released a live album called "Rock at Live Wood" (recorded at Rockwood Music Hall in New York City), followed up by a full-length studio album of all-new material called "Lucky Guy" in 2016, which was funded by fans via PledgeMusic.

Collaborations
Greg has co-written and recorded songs with legendary Stax Records recording artist, William Bell.

Discography

Solo albums
 Trunk Songs (2008), Phrex Records
 Realign Your Mind (2010), Phrex Records
 People You May Know (2011), Phrex Records
 Bohemia (2013), Phrex Records
 Cosmic Irony EP (2014), Phrex Records

as Greg Humphreys Electric Trio
 Rock at Live Wood (live album) (2014), Phrex Records
 Lucky Guy (2016), Phrex Records
 Haymaker (2018), Phrex Records

with Hobex
 Payback EP (1996), Phrex Records
 Back in the ‘90s (1998), Phrex Records
 Back in the ‘90s (1999), Slash/London Records
 Wisteria (2000), Phrex Records
 U Ready Man? (2002), Tonecool/Artemis Records
 Live at the Pour House (DVD) (2007), Phrex Records
 Enlightened Soul (2007), Phrex Records
 Live at Shakori Hills (2009), Phrex Records

with Dillon Fence
 Dillon Fence EP (1989), NoCar Records
 Christmas EP (1991), Mammoth Records
 Rosemary (1992), Mammoth Records
 Daylight EP (1992), Mammoth Records
 Outside In (1993), Mammoth Records
 Black Eyed Susan 7" (1993), Mammoth Records
 Any Other Way EP (1993), Mammoth Records
 Living Room Scene (1994), Mammoth Records
 Live at the Cat's Cradle (2001), Phrex Records
 Best + (2004), Morisen Records

References

External links

Year of birth missing (living people)
Living people
People from Winston-Salem, North Carolina
American male singer-songwriters
American rock singers
American rhythm and blues singers
American soul singers
American funk singers
American rock guitarists
American rhythm and blues guitarists
American soul guitarists
American funk guitarists
Singer-songwriters from North Carolina